| tries ={{#expr: 
 + 2 + 5 + 5
 + 2 + 3 + 4
 + 7 + 4 + 5
}}
| top point scorer    = Louis Strydom (South African Kings)(47 points)
| top try scorer      = Siyanda Grey (South African Kings)(6 tries)
| venue               = 
| attendance2         = 
| champions           =  South African Kings
| count               = 1
| runner-up           = 
| website             = IRB Nations Cup
| previous year       = 2010
| previous tournament = 2010 IRB Nations Cup
| next year           = 2012
| next tournament     = 2012 IRB Nations Cup
}}
The 2011 IRB Nations Cup was the sixth edition of the international rugby union tournament, a competition created by the International Rugby Board.  It pits the "A" Teams of the stronger (Tier 1) rugby nations (e.g. Argentina Jaguars) against some Tier 2 and 3 nations (e.g. Romania).

For the fifth consecutive year the event was held in Bucharest, Romania.  Namibia returned to defend their title, but South African Kings were the overall winners of the tournament.

The competition format was a modified round-robin whereby the three ENC teams (Romania, Georgia and Portugal) played the other three teams (Argentina Jaguars, Namibia and South African Kings).  The competition was played over three match days, with three matches played consecutively on each day.

Final standings

Fixtures

Round 1
IRB Reports

Round 2
IRB Reports

Round 3
IRB Reports

Top scorers

Top points scorers

Source: irb.com

Top try scorers

Source: irb.com

See also 

2011 IRB Pacific Nations Cup

References

External links
IRB Overview
IRB Fixtures/Results
IRB Standings

2011
2011 rugby union tournaments for national teams
International rugby union competitions hosted by Romania
2010–11 in Romanian rugby union
2011 in South African rugby union
2011 in Argentine rugby union
rugby union
rugby union
rugby union
Sport in Bucharest